HD 16955, also known as HR 803, is a double or multiple star. With an apparent visual magnitude of 6.376, is lies at or below the nominal limit for visibility with a typical naked eye. The measured annual parallax shift is 9.59 milliarcseconds, which yields an estimated distance of around 340 light years. The star is moving closer to the Sun with a heliocentric radial velocity of around -10 km/s.

This is an A-type main-sequence star with a stellar classification of A3 V. Hauck et al. (1995) identified this as a Lambda Boötis star with a circumstellar shell, but this now appears to be unlikely. It has 2.25 times the mass of the Sun and is spinning rapidly with a projected rotational velocity of 175 km/s. The star is radiating about 27 times the Sun's luminosity from its photosphere at an effective temperature of roughly 8,450 K.

HD 16955 has a magnitude 10.36 companion, component B, which is located, as of 2015, at an angular separation of 3.0 arcseconds along a position angle of 19°. This is the likely source for the detected X-ray emission with a luminosity of  coming from these coordinates, since A-type stars are not expected to emit X-rays. Component C is a more distant magnitude 12.94 companion located at a separation of 51.10 arcseconds along a position angle of 92°, as of 2015.

References

A-type main-sequence stars
Lambda Boötis stars
Double stars
Aries (constellation)
Durchmusterung objects
016955
012744
0803